Anomalodesmata is an superorder of saltwater clams, marine bivalve molluscs. This grouping was formerly recognised as a taxonomic subclass. It is called a superorder in the current World Register of Marine Species, despite having no orders, to parallel it with sister taxon Imparidentia, which does have orders.

Description
The shells of species in this order are of equal size, as are the muscles that hold them closed, and the margins at the hinges are thickened. The margins of the mantle are also fused, and there is only a single hinge tooth, if any.

Families
In 2010, a new proposed classification system for the Bivalvia was published in Malacologia by Bieler, Carter & Coan revising the classification of the Bivalvia, including the order Anomalodesmata. The following tree is their info which has been updated with the latest information from the World Register of Marine Species:

Order: Anomalodesmata
Superfamily: Clavagelloidea
Family: Clavagellidae
Family: Penicillidae
Superfamily: Cuspidarioidea
 Family: Cuspidariidae
 Family: Halonymphidae
 Family: Protocuspidariidae
 Family: Spheniopsidae
Superfamily: Myochamoidea
Family: Cleidothaeridae
Family: Myochamidae
Superfamily: Pandoroidea
 Family: Lyonsiidae
 Family: Pandoridae
Superfamily: Pholadomyoidea
 Family: †Arenigomyidae
 Family: †Margaritariidae
 Family: Parilimyidae
 Family: Pholadomyidae
 Family: †Ucumariidae
Superfamily: Poromyoidea
 Family: Cetoconchidae
 Family: Poromyidae
Superfamily: Thracioidea
 Family: †Burmesiidae
 Family: Clistoconchidae
 Family: Laternulidae
 Family: Periplomatidae
 Family: Thraciidae
Superfamily: Verticordioidea
 Family: Euciroidae
 Family: Lyonsiellidae
 Family: Verticordiidae

References

 Powell A W B, New Zealand Mollusca, William Collins Publishers Ltd, Auckland, New Zealand 1979

External links
 

 
Bivalve orders